Dahleez (transl. Threshold) is a 1986 Indian Bollywood film directed by Ravi Chopra and produced by B. R. Chopra. It stars Jackie Shroff, Raj Babbar and Meenakshi Sheshadri in lead roles along with Smita Patil, Aruna Irani, Zarina Wahab and Shafi Inamdar in supporting roles.

Plot
Indian Army Officer Colonel Rahul Saxena marries the attractive Naini and they begin to live a fairly harmonious life. This harmony is soon disrupted when Rahul is called to the front, leaving Naini behind to continue living a lonely and isolated life. When Rahul returns from the front, he senses a change in Naini and decides to follow her. He finds out that she is having an affair with a young man named Chandrashekhar and this knowledge devastates him. He does not mention about this knowledge to Naini and makes an arrangement to return to the front and volunteers for a dangerous mission into enemy territory. And the person accompanying him is none other than Chandrashekhar. Will Rahul be focused enough to concentrate on the mission or will he be sidetracked to put an end to Chandrashekhar's life?

Cast
 Jackie Shroff as Chandrashekhar
 Raj Babbar as Colonel Rahul Saxena
 Meenakshi Sheshadri as Naini Saxena
 Smita Patil as Sukhbir Kaur
 Aruna Irani as Saroj
 Shafi Inamdar as Major General Khushal Singh
 Zarina Wahab as Jameela Ali
 Vijayendra Ghatge as Ahmed Ali
 Rajesh Puri as Lallu
 Puneet Issar  
 Arun Bakshi  
 Dalip Tahil as Sukhdev

Soundtrack
Lyrics: Hasan Kamal

References

External links

1980s Hindi-language films
Indian action drama films
1986 films
Films scored by Ravi
Films directed by Ravi Chopra